USM Alger Under-23s are the reserve team of USM Alger. The team mainly consists of Under-23 players at the club, although senior players occasionally play in the reserve side, for instance when they are recovering from injury. The Under-23s team are managed by Sylvain Matrisciano and they play in the Ligue Professionnelle 1.

History
USM Alger is one of the clubs that owns a well-known football school in Algeria. In the seventies the club relied on players who graduated from the club most notably Djamel Zidane and Djamel Keddou who spent all his football career with USM Alger. In the eighties, ninety percent of the squad was from the team, especially in the winning season of the Algerian Cup in 1988. Where was the majority of the players from the club, where coach Djamel Keddou put his trust in the colleagues of Farid Bengana, Amirouche Lalili, Farid Mouaci, Salim Boutamine, Athmane Nourine and Tarek Hadj Adlane.

The Players

Ligue Professionnelle 1

Current squad
These players can also play with the senior squad and are all Young Professionals.

Notable graduates
Current USM Alger players in bold.

Honours
Ligue Professionnelle 1 U21
Winners: 2012–13, 2013–14, 2014–15, 2015–16.
Ligue Professionnelle 1 U18
Winners: 2011–12.
Algerian Cup Junior
Winners: 1972, 1973, 1975, 1989, 1998, 2000.
Runners Up: 1970.
Algerian U21 Cup
Winners: 2018
Algerian Cup Under-18s
Winners: 2017.
Runners Up: 2016.
Algerian Cup Under-17s
Winners: 2011.
Runners Up: 2007, 2015.
Algerian Cup Under-15s
Runners Up: 2008, 2011, 2015.

References

Reserves and Academy